Sir Norman Henry Denham Henty, KBE (13 October 1903 – 9 May 1978) was an Australian  politician. He was a member of the Liberal Party and served as a Senator for Tasmania from 1950 to 1968. He held ministerial office as Minister for Customs and Excise (1956–1964), Civil Aviation (1964–1966), and Supply (1966–1968). He also served as mayor of Launceston from 1948 to 1949.

Early life
Henty was born in Longford, Tasmania, the second child of Thomas Norman Henty and Sarah Nina Lily Mary, née Wilson. His grandfather was Thomas Henty, part of the pioneering Henty family. He was educated at Launceston Church Grammar School. He left school at fourteen to work in his fathers wholesale business.  In March 1930 he married Faith Gordon Spotswood and they subsequently had three sons and a daughter.  He served as an alderman on Launceston City Council from 1943 to 1951 and was mayor from 1948 to 1949.

Politics
Henty was elected to the Senate of Australia at the 1949 election, representing the Liberal Party and served until his retirement in June 1968.  He served as Minister for Customs and Excise from October 1956 to June 1964.  In 1960 he prohibited the export of Australian native fauna for commercial purposes. From June 1964 to January 1966, he was  Minister for Civil Aviation and he was then Minister for Supply until February 1968.

Honours
He was knighted in 1968 for parliamentary service. The Denham Henty Waterscape in Launceston's Civic Square is named in his honour.

Notes

Liberal Party of Australia members of the Parliament of Australia
Members of the Australian Senate for Tasmania
Members of the Australian Senate
Members of the Cabinet of Australia
1903 births
1978 deaths
Australian Knights Commander of the Order of the British Empire
Australian politicians awarded knighthoods
Mayors of Launceston, Tasmania
20th-century Australian politicians